Pempelia palumbella is a moth of the family Pyralidae. It is found in Europe.

The moth flies in one generation from May to September.

The caterpillars feed on calluna, ericaceae species, thyme and polygalaceae species.

Notes

The flight season refers to Belgium and the Netherlands. This may vary in other parts of the range.

External links
waarneming.nl  
Lepidoptera of Belgium
Pempelia palumbella on UKmoths

Moths described in 1775
Phycitini
Moths of Europe
Moths of Asia